The 2015 Judo Grand Slam Paris was held in Paris, France, from 17 to 18 October 2015.

Medal summary

Men's events

Women's events

Source Results

Medal table

References

External links
 

2015 IJF World Tour
2015 Judo Grand Slam
Judo
Grand Slam Paris 2015
Judo
Judo